Narraguagus Jr/Sr High School is a regional secondary school in Harrington, Maine, United States providing education to the communities of Addison, Cherryfield, Columbia, Columbia Falls, Harrington, and Milbridge. The school is operated by Maine School Administrative District 37 and is named for the Narraguagus River, which flows through the towns of Cherryfield and Milbridge.

The school has 300 students in grades 7–12. The school is 96.4% white, and 3.6% other ethnicities as of a 2005 census. There are six special education teachers, and 24 other teachers, creating an average of 12 students per teacher.

Academics
Narraguagus offers a variety of courses focusing on college preparation, vocational education and career technology.

Courses
 Advanced Placement: English, Statistics, U.S. History
 Honors: English, Algebra I & II, Geometry, Calculus, Chemistry, Physics, Women Writers
 Vocational & Career Technology: Auto & Diesel Technology, Building Trades, Criminal Justice, Culinary Arts, Entrepreneurship, Marine Technology, Marketing, Microsoft for Business

Athletics
Narraguagus is a member of the Maine Principals' Association.

Boys
 Baseball
 Basketball
 Cross Country
 Golf
 Soccer
 Track & Field
 Drama
 Cheerleading

Girls
 Basketball
 Cross Country
 Golf
 Soccer
 Softball
 Track & Field
 Volleyball
 Drama
 Cheerleading

Notable alumni

Katie Aselton (Miss Maine Teen USA, actress)

References 

Public high schools in Maine
Schools in Washington County, Maine